Daniel Interchange is a key freeway interchange in the Central District of Israel, located west of its namesake, the village of Kfar Daniel and just south of Ben Shemen Interchange.  The interchange takes the form of a 1.5 kilometer long road concurrency of Highway 1 and Highway 6 running north–south.  It is possible to switch between Highways 1 and 6 only proceeding in the same general direction of north or south (toward Tel Aviv or Jerusalem respectively on Highway 1).  Reversing direction is possible at the adjacent Ben Shemen Interchange to the northwest or via Route 431 to the southeast.

References

Road interchanges in Israel